The WDF Virtual Cup was the first and only edition organised by the World Darts Federation, when the coronavirus pandemic stopped the organization of many international tournaments.

Member countries may select two men and two women to compete in this event. All matches will be played online and participating players will need one device to keep score, one device with camera to show dartboards, reliable WiFi internet access, DartConnect membership and Skype account. The Virtual Cup will have men's and women's singles competitions composed of group-stage with the top four of each group advancing to a knock-out stage.

Patrik Kovács and Fallon Sherrock was a competition winners.

Men's draw

Women's draw

Top averages
This table shows the highest averages achieved by players throughout the knock-out stage of tournament.

References

WDF Virtual Cup